Vasyl Novokhatskyi (born 24 September 1974) is a retired footballer who played as a midfielder for clubs in Ukraine, Greece, and Israel. His last name often is misspelled as Novohatsky, because of a transliteration inconsistency.

Club career
Novokhatskyi began playing football for Ukrainian Premier League side PFC Nyva Vinnytsia. Soon, he joined FC CSKA Kyiv, and would score a goal as the club lost the 1997–98 Ukrainian Cup final.

In July 1995, Novokhatskyi joined Greek Superleague side Ionikos F.C. for the one season. He spent the following season with Maccabi Haifa F.C. before returning to Greece to play for Panachaiki F.C. for one season.

He played for Greek third division side Chania F.C. during the 2001–02 season.

References

External links

Profile at legioner.kulichki.com
ΞΕΝΟΙ ΠΑΙΚΤΕΣ ΚΑΙ ΠΡΟΠΟΝΗΤΕΣ ΤΗΣ ΠΑΝΑΧΑΪΚΗΣ

1974 births
Living people
People from Kalynivka
Ukrainian footballers
FC Nyva Vinnytsia players
FC Dnipro Cherkasy players
FC CSKA Kyiv players
FC Arsenal Kyiv players
Ionikos F.C. players
Panachaiki F.C. players
Maccabi Haifa F.C. players
Ukrainian military personnel of the war in Donbas
Association football midfielders
Sportspeople from Vinnytsia Oblast